Miriam Levine (born 1939) is an American memoirist, poet and novelist. Levine was the first Poet Laureate of Arlington, Massachusetts.

Biography
Levine was born in Paterson, New Jersey, the daughter of Gertrude and Joseph Levine.  She spent her early years in Passaic, New Jersey and earned a BA and MA in Comparative Literature from Boston University and a PhD in British Literature from Tufts University.

Levine was a professor at Framingham State University; and, before that, taught at Emerson College, University of Massachusetts Boston, and Northeastern University.

Awards
Levine, winner of the Autumn House Poetry Prize, is a recipient of grants from the National Endowment for the Arts and the Massachusetts Artists Foundation.  Awarded a Pushcart Prize, she was a resident fellow at Yaddo; Le Chateau de Lavigny International Writers' Colony, Switzerland; and Millay Colony for the Arts.

Works
 Saving Daylight (2019)
 The Dark Opens (2008)
 In Paterson: a Novel (2002)
 Devotion (1993)
 A Guide to Writers’ Homes in New England (1984)
 The Graves of Delawanna (1981)
 To Know We Are Living (1976)
 Friends Dreaming (1974)

References

External links 
Miriam Levine’s website

1939 births
Living people
20th-century American women writers
21st-century American women writers
20th-century American poets
21st-century American poets
American women poets
Writers from Passaic, New Jersey
Writers from Paterson, New Jersey
Poets from Massachusetts
Poets from New Jersey
American women memoirists
Municipal Poets Laureate in the United States
Emerson College faculty
People from Arlington, Massachusetts
Tufts University School of Arts and Sciences alumni
Boston University alumni
University of Massachusetts Boston faculty
Framingham State University faculty
Northeastern University faculty
20th-century American novelists
Novelists from Massachusetts
American women novelists
21st-century American novelists
Novelists from New Jersey